The Martin Luther Marsh House was built in 1873, and is located at 254 Boulder Street in Nevada City, in the Gold Country of Nevada County, California.

History
The Martin Luther Marsh House's architecture and engineering were significant during the California Gold Rush period of 1850–1874. The single family home is of Italianate Style-Victorian design.  It bears a hip roofed cupola and the windows are arched.

Restoration
Briefly in the 1970s, the Marsh House was the American Victorian Museum, founded by Carol and David Fluke, (owners/funding,) Ruthe Hamm, (owner/funding,) and co-founders David Osborne and Charles Woods.

Recent restoration in the late 1990s by a well known Victorian architectural contractor from San Francisco saw a complete interior restoration and replacement of natural woods, new stained glass, a new conservatory on the west side with 3 walls of glass.  The dining room has an outstanding stained glass ceiling and an antique crystal ceiling piece. The exterior restoration included replacement of the rotting quoins with redwood duplicates, a new roof, rain gutters, and exterior painting in historical colors, including white trim. It's situated in a park-like setting on Boulder Street 1/2 mile east of the downtown Nevada City core.

Landmark
On 19 January 1972, the Martin Luther Marsh House was designated a California Point of Historical Interest No. P241.

Less than a year later, on 11 April 1973, this Nevada County building was designated as a landmark by the National Register of Historic Places.

See also
National Register of Historic Places listings in Nevada County, California

References

Houses in Nevada County, California
Buildings and structures in Nevada City, California
History of Nevada City, California
Houses completed in 1873
California Historical Landmarks
Houses on the National Register of Historic Places in California
National Register of Historic Places in Nevada County, California
Italianate architecture in California
Victorian architecture in California
1873 establishments in California